The 2003 Tunbridge Wells Borough Council election took place on 1 May 2003 to elect members of Tunbridge Wells Borough Council in Kent, England. One third of the council was up for election and the Conservative Party stayed in overall control of the council.

After the election, the composition of the council was:
Conservative 33
Liberal Democrat 12
Labour 3

Results

By ward

References

2003 English local elections
2003
2000s in Kent